The R50 is a provincial route in South Africa that connects Pretoria with Standerton via Delmas and Leandra.

Route

Gauteng

The R50 begins in Pretoria, Tshwane (Administrative Capital of South Africa) near the suburbs of Erasmusrand and Waterkloof Ridge, at an intersection with the N1 Danie Joubert Freeway (Pretoria Eastern Bypass). North of the freeway, it is designated as the M9 Metropolitan Route and named Rigel Avenue. It begins as Delmas Road and heads south-east, passing through Erasmuskloof and meeting the M10 Metropolitan Route (Solomon Mahlangu Drive) before passing in-between Wingate Park and Elardus Park and becoming the eastern border of the Rietvlei Nature Reserve. The R50 heads south-east to Bapsfontein, Ekurhuleni. The distance from the N1 intersection in Pretoria to Bapsfontein is 30km.

Upon entering Bapsfontein, the R50 meets the R25 Route from Kempton Park. They are cosigned as one road up to the four-way junction of Bapsfontein, where they meet the northern terminus of the R51 Route from Daveyton/Springs. As the R25 becomes the road to the north-east at that junction towards Bronkhorstspruit, the R50 remains as the south-easterly road.

Mpumalanga

The R50 runs another 30 km to the town of Delmas, crossing the border between Gauteng and Mpumalanga. Just before entering Delmas, the R50 meets the N12 Freeway between Johannesburg and Witbank. In Delmas, The R50 meets the R42 Route from Bronkhorstspruit. They are one road for the next 5km south-east, intersecting with the R555 Road during this time.

South of Delmas, The R42 becomes its own road, heading south-west towards Nigel, Gauteng, leaving the R50 as the south-easterly road. The road continues east-south-east. After meeting the R580, the R50 turns directly south towards the town of Leandra. The journey from Delmas to Leandra is 45 km.

In Leandra, the R50 intersects with the R29 Road in Leandra Central and the N17 Highway about 3 kilometers south of the town centre (Both roads coming from Springs and Johannesburg in the west). The R50 journeys another 80km, intersecting with the R547 Road near Brendan Village (staggered junction; cosigned for a few kilometers), to the town of Standerton.

In Standerton, the R50 reaches its south-eastern terminus by meeting the passing R546 Route from Evander, the passing R23 Route from Heidelberg and the south-western terminus of the R39 Route from Ermelo.

References

External links
 Routes Travel Info

50
50
Provincial routes in South Africa